Sun Yaoting (Traditional Chinese: 孫耀庭, Simplified Chinese: 孙耀庭, Hanyu Pinyin: Sūn Yàotíng, Wade-Giles: Sun Yao-t'ing; 29 September 1902 – 17 December 1996) was the last surviving imperial eunuch of Chinese history. He was castrated at the age of eight by his father with a single razor cut, mere months before the last emperor Pu Yi was deposed. He still became a palace eunuch and had become the attendant to the empress before the imperial family was expelled from the Forbidden City, following which he continued to serve in Manchukuo until the puppet state's collapse.

The 1988 dramatic film Lai Shi, China's Last Eunuch is based on Sun Yaoting's life. His biography The Last Eunuch of China was published in 1998 and translated to English in 2008.

References

1902 births
1996 deaths
Qing dynasty eunuchs
Writers from Tianjin